Euryphura athymoides is a butterfly in the family Nymphalidae. It is found in southern Cameroon, the Central African Republic, the Republic of the Congo and the Democratic Republic of the Congo.

References

Butterflies described in 1981
Limenitidinae